Crisilla galvagni is a species of minute sea snail, a marine gastropod mollusk or micromollusk in the family Rissoidae.

Description
The shell attains a length of 1.4 mm.

Distribution
This marine species occurs in the Western Mediterranean Sea.

References

  Scuderi D. & Amati B. (2013) Rediscovery and re-evaluation of a “ghost” taxon: the case of Rissoa galvagni Aradas et Maggiore, 1844 (Caenogastropoda Rissoidae). Biodiversity Journal 3(4): 511-520

External links
 

Rissoidae
Gastropods described in 1844